Henriette, is a city in Pine County, Minnesota, United States. The population was 71 at the 2010 census.

Henriette was founded as Cornell.

Geography

Minnesota State Highway 107 and Pine County 11 are two of the main routes in the community.

Demographics

2010 census
As of the census of 2010, there were 71 people, 32 households, and 19 families living in the city. The racial makeup of the city was 90.1% White, 1.4% Asian, 4.2% from other races, and 4.2% from two or more races. Hispanic or Latino of any race were 4.2% of the population.

There were 32 households, of which 28.1% had children under the age of 18 living with them, 31.3% were married couples living together, 15.6% had a female householder with no husband present, 12.5% had a male householder with no wife present, and 40.6% were non-families. 40.6% of all households were made up of individuals, and 15.7% had someone living alone who was 65 years of age or older. The average household size was 2.22 and the average family size was 2.84.

The median age in the city was 44.3 years. 22.5% of residents were under the age of 18; 8.4% were between the ages of 18 and 24; 21.1% were from 25 to 44; 25.3% were from 45 to 64; and 22.5% were 65 years of age or older. The gender makeup of the city was 54.9% male and 45.1% female.

2000 census
As of the census of 2000, there were 101 people, 37 households, and 24 families living in the city. The racial makeup of the city was 95.05% White, 1.98% Native American, 2.97% from other races. Hispanic or Latino of any race were 4.95% of the population.

There were 37 households, out of which 45.9% had children under the age of 18 living with them, 35.1% were married couples living together, 21.6% had a female householder with no husband present, and 35.1% were non-families. 27.0% of all households were made up of individuals, and 5.4% had someone living alone who was 65 years of age or older. The average household size was 2.73 and the average family size was 3.33.

In the city, the population was spread out, with 34.7% under the age of 18, 9.9% from 18 to 24, 31.7% from 25 to 44, 17.8% from 45 to 64, and 5.9% who were 65 years of age or older. The median age was 30 years. For every 100 females, there were 152.5 males. For every 100 females age 18 and over, there were 112.9 males.

The median income for a household in the city was $28,542, and the median income for a family was $42,917. Males had a median income of $24,167 versus $16,250 for females. The per capita income for the city was $13,312. There were no families and 12.6% of the population living below the poverty line, including no under eighteens and none of those over 64.

References

Cities in Minnesota
Cities in Pine County, Minnesota